Leon Chase "Red" Phillips (December 9, 1890 – March 27, 1958) was an American attorney, a state legislator and the 11th governor of Oklahoma from 1939 to 1943. As a member of the Oklahoma House of Representatives and as Speaker of the Oklahoma House of Representatives, Phillips made a name for himself as an obstructionist of the proposals of governors William H. Murray and E.W. Marland, including components of the New Deal. As governor, Phillips pushed for deep cuts, but was unable to avoid an unbalanced budget.

After retiring from politics, he worked as an attorney before his death from a heart attack. He is buried in Weleetka, Oklahoma.

Early life and career
Phillips was born to Rufus Putnam and Bertha Violet (Bressler) Phillips in Worth County, Missouri, and moved to Foss in Custer County, Oklahoma at an early age. While a student at Epworth University in Oklahoma City, he studied for the ministry, but changed to law and received his LL.B. from the University of Oklahoma in 1916.  He married Myrtle Ellenberger of Norman, Oklahoma, on June 19, 1916, and they had two children.

Phillips was admitted to the State Bar in that year and to practice before the United States Supreme Court later. After service in World War I, as a private in the US Army, he returned to Okemah, where he practiced law.

Political career
Elected three times to the Oklahoma House of Representatives from 1933 to 1938, he served as Speaker of the House in 1935. He led opposition to proposals from governors William H. Murray and E.W. Marland, the latter of which helped him attain his seat as Speaker.

Phillips ran against Ross Rizley in the 1938 Oklahoma gubernatorial election. He was elected Governor of Oklahoma in 1938, and served from January 9, 1939, to January 11, 1943.

During his governorship, Phillips was charged with accepting a bribe, was tried twice, but was eventually acquitted. Phillips was the first state representative to be elected as Governor of Oklahoma and his term was marked by his proposals to trim the state budget. Despite deep cuts, the budget produced by the 17th Oklahoma Legislature was not balanced; it was the last budget not subject to constitutional requirements to balance the budget approved by voters in 1941. Phillips was responsible for the constitutional amendment requiring a balanced budget of the Oklahoma Legislature.

Phillips considered the New Deal to be federal interference in the state and was an obstructionist.

Later life
After he retired from the office of Governor, Phillips returned to his farm near Okemah, Oklahoma, and continued to practice law until his death. He died, of a heart attack, while waiting for a client at the post office in Okmulgee on March 27, 1958.

References

External links 
 
 The Political Graveyard

1890 births
1958 deaths
People from Grant City, Missouri
United States Army personnel of World War I
Democratic Party governors of Oklahoma
Oklahoma lawyers
University of Oklahoma alumni
Methodists from Oklahoma
Old Right (United States)
20th-century American politicians
Speakers of the Oklahoma House of Representatives
Democratic Party members of the Oklahoma House of Representatives
People from Okemah, Oklahoma